Penny Green is an Australian criminologist. She has been a Professor of Law and Globalisation and Head of the Department of Law at Queen Mary University of London since September 2014.

Biography
Green studied psychology, anthropology and sociology at the Australian National University. She graduated in 1979. She went to the UK and obtained her doctorate in Criminology at Cambridge.

Before being appointed as Professor at Queen Mary University of London she was Professor of Law and Criminology at King's College London and worked at the University of Southampton, University of Westminster, and the London School of Economics. Green is the founder of the International State Crime Initiative.

In March 2016, she was shortlisted as replacement for Makarim Wibisono as United Nations special rapporteur on the situation of human rights in the Palestinian territories occupied since 1967, along with Michael Lynk. Michael Lynk was appointed to this role.

Publications
 
  
 
 State Crime (2005) Special Issue: The British Journal of Criminology, 2005, Vo. 45, No. 4, pp 434–445

Journals and book chapters
 "Understanding State Crime", (2016) with Tony Ward, Oxford Handbook of Criminology Oxford: OUP
 "Evicting Palestine" (2016), with Amelia Smith, in State Crime Journal Special Issue: Palestine, Palestinians and Israeli State Crime (eds Green, P. and Shalhoub-Kervorkian,N.) Vol. 5, No.1
 "Law, the State and the Dialectics of State Crime" (2016) in Critical Criminology, Vol. 24, No. 2
 "Civil Society And State Crime: Repression, Resistance And Transition in Burma and Tunisia" (2014) with Ward, T.  in Chambliss, W. J. and Moloney, C. J. (eds.) State Crime: Critical Concepts in Criminology, New York:  Routledge
 "Enclosing the Commons: Predatory capital and forced evictions in Papua New Guinea and Burma" (2014), with Lasslett, K.  and Sherwood, A. in 
 
 "Islamophobia: Burma’s Racist Fault-line" in Race and Class October–December 2013; 55
 
 "State Crime: A Dialectical View" (2012)  (with T. Ward) in M. Maguire, R. Morgan, and Reiner, R.(eds) The Oxford Handbook of Criminology
 "States, Crime and Violence" in (2010) Sistema Penal & Violência, Porto Alegre, vol. 2, no. 2, pp. 1-14, jul./dez
 "Civil Society, Resistance and State Crime" (2012) in L. Stanley and J. McCulloch State Crime and Resistance London: Sage
 "State-Building and the Logic of Violence in Iraq" (2009) (with T. Ward) Journal of Scandinavian Studies in Criminology and Crime Prevention
 "The Transformation of Violence in Iraq" (with T. Ward) British Journal of Criminology (2009) 49(5): 609-627.

See also
State-corporate crime

References

Year of birth missing (living people)
Living people
Academics of King's College London
Australian criminologists
Australian women academics
Australian academics
Australian women criminologists
Academics of Queen Mary University of London